Françoise Saudan (born 9 November 1939 in Lyon, Martigny) is a Swiss politician from the FDP.The Liberals.

Saudan studied law and received her doctorate. After that she worked as a manager.

In 1985 she was elected to the Grand Council of Geneva and nominated in the same year as President of the FDP Geneva. She held the presidency until 1995, when she was elected to the Senate on December 4. In 2000-01 she was president of the Council of States.

Saudan is married and has two children. She lives in Chêne-Bougeries.

References

1939 births
Members of the Council of States (Switzerland)
Presidents of the Council of States (Switzerland)
Living people
Politicians from Lyon
People from the canton of Geneva
Women members of the Council of States (Switzerland)
20th-century Swiss women politicians
20th-century Swiss politicians
21st-century Swiss women politicians
21st-century Swiss politicians
Free Democratic Party of Switzerland politicians